Tehillim (תהלים) may refer to:

The Hebrew name of the biblical Book of Psalms
Tehillim (Reich), a 1981 piece of music by Steve Reich
Tehilim (film), a 2007 Israeli film directed by Raphaël Nadjari
Tehillim, 2010 and 2014 compositions by David Ezra Okonşar